James J. Mitteager (17 July 1946 – 24 July 1997) was an American journalist who worked for several tabloid newspapers and covered numerous high-profile incidents.

Life and career

In 1973 Mitteager worked for the New York City Police Department before becoming a journalist. In 1979 while working as a freelance writer for the New York Post, Mitteager was acquitted on charges that he had bribed a correction officer to obtain photographs and information about murderer David Berkowitz.

In 1989, Mitteager helped The National Enquirer scoop People in getting the first photo of Riley Keough, oldest grandchild of Elvis Presley and Priscilla Presley.

In late 1993, Mitteager was ousted as Los Angeles Globe Bureau Chief for alleged sexual harassment after which he became a freelancer for the Enquirer and tipped off celebrity private eye Anthony Pellicano about damning stories in the works on a number of celebrities Pellicano represented through their respective lawyers.

Mitteager illegally audiotape telephone talks between him and tabloid sources as well as fellow tabloid employees, other reporters and the like. 

After Mitteager's death, his beloved wife Carol phoned Pellicano's field investigator Paul Barresi and told him that her husband left him a box filled with what she suspected was files. The box contained files and audiotapes which were subpoenaed by the FBI and later used to assist the Los Angeles US attorney in the Anthony Pellicano illegal wiretapping trial. To protect Mitteager's family from going through the grueling Federal interrogation he had to contend with, not to mention how close he came to being arrested, Barresi did not implicate Mitteager's family.

References

1946 births
1997 deaths
20th-century American writers
20th-century American journalists
American male journalists